Aulnay, commonly referred to as Aulnay-de-Saintonge, is a commune in the Charente-Maritime department, region of Nouvelle-Aquitaine (before 2015: Poitou-Charentes), France.

The inhabitants of the commune are known as Aulnaysiens or Aulnaysiennes.

Geography
Aulnay is located on the Via Turonensis. one of the Ways of St. James some 45 km east by south-east of Surgères and 17 km north-east of Saint-Jean-d'Angély. Access to the commune is by the D950 from Les Églises-d'Argenteuil in the south-west which passes through the commune just west of the town and continues to La Villedieu in the north. The D121 comes from Saint-Georges-de-Longuepierre in the north-west passing through the town and continuing south to Cherbonnières. The D129 comes from Varaize in the south passing through the town and continuing north-east to Saint-Mandé-sur-Brédoire. The D133 goes from the town south-east to Néré. In the commune there is the village of La Cressoniere west of the town, Pinsenelle north-west of the town, and Salles-lès-Aulnay east of the town. Apart from the urban area of the town the commune is entirely farmland.

Hydrography
The Brédoire river flows through the commune and the town from east to west to join the Boutonne at Nuaillé-sur-Boutonne. Although a small river the Brédoire flooded the town in December 1982. The Palud flows through the north of the commune from the east to join the Brédoire at La Cressoniere. The Saudrenne flows from the east in the south of the commune forming part of the southern border before continuing to join the Boutonne at Saint-Pardoult.

Neighbouring communes and villages

History

Aulnay during the Roman Empire
Formerly called Aunedonnacum in the itinerary of Antoninus Pius and Auedonnaco in the Tabula Peutingeriana, Aulnay was a Gallo-Roman station on the important imperial Roman road between Saintes and Poitiers, and possibly between Saintes and Lyon before a more direct route, the Via Agrippa, was built.

Aerial photographs taken by aerial archaeologist Jacques Dassié and archaeological excavations have revealed a remarkable Roman camp at a place called Rocherou. This castrum was created for strategic reasons around the year 21 AD and abandoned around the year 43 AD. Its construction was carried out modelled on Roman camps in the conquest of Germania under the Principate of Augustus (along the Lippe) and also on camps on the limes of the Rhine due to the attested presence of displaced legions from Germania. Several Roman inscriptions have been found.

Aerial photography has also revealed the existence of a Fanum with a polygonal Cella and a Peribolos, proof of the existence of an important Gallo-Roman city.

Aulnay in the Middle Ages

As the capital of a fiscal jurisdiction Aulnay was already the seat of a lordship in 925, as evidenced by the donation made by Cadelon I to several abbeys. The Viscounts of Aulnay (or Viscounts of Aunay) were descendants of other noble families in Poitou and Saintonge and lived in a castle which was demolished in 1818 but whose tower still remains.

Aulnay in the contemporary era
A common name for Aulnay is Aulnay-de-Saintonge but under the Ancien Régime Aulnay (often spelled Aunay) did not belong to the province of Saintonge but to the Province of Poitou and the Diocese of Poitiers.

By decree dated 12 December 1973 the commune of Salles-lès-Aulnay merged with the commune of Aulnay.

Aulnay is the capital of the canton of Aulnay-de-Saintonge which has the largest extent in the department of Charente-Maritime.

Heraldry

Administration

List of Successive Mayors

Demography
In 2017 the commune had 1,369 inhabitants.

Distribution of Age Groups
The population of the town is older than the departmental average.

Percentage Distribution of Age Groups in Aulnay and Charente-Maritime Department in 2017

Source: INSEE

Economy

Old Railway service
The Compagnie de chemins de fer départementaux (Departmental Railway Company or CFD) operated the  Charentes and Deux-Sèvres railway network with a line crossing the commune. This was the Saint-Jean-d'Angély to Saint-Saviol line (1896-1951). The first locomotives used were built by Derosne-Cail. The old station buildings were transferred to the Departmental Directorate of Public Works in 1954.

The Goizin factory for agricultural Ploughs
The Goizin factory was once the largest industrial employer in the commune. Robert Goizin first set up a maintenance workshop and sold spare parts for agricultural equipment with a shop to display them.

During the 1950s he successfully turned to the manufacture of ploughs. The evolution in the power of tractors lead to significant growth in the 1970s. The company employed up to 80 workers until the end of the 20th century.

After some difficult years, since 2005 the company has belonged to the Eurotechnics Agri Groupe but it remains active in Aulnay.

Culture and heritage

Civil heritage
The commune has a number of buildings and structures that are registered as historical monuments:
The Minargent Distillery (1910)
A Chateau (13th century)
A Dairy Factory (1926)

Other sites of interest
A large Dovecote with 2,000 pigeonholes which was recently restored.

Religious heritage

The commune has several religious buildings and structures that are registered as historical monuments:
A Cemetery Cross (14th century)
The Church of Saint-Pierre d'Aulnay (12th century). One of the finest surviving Romanesque churches. It is also classified as a UNESCO World Heritage Site. It is unknown why the church was built so far from the town but it may be related to the site of an old cemetery along the Roman road. At the end of the 11th century the building that preceded it belonged to the Abbey of Saint-Cyprien in Poitiers who, around 1045, received part of the burial rights and wax offerings from the church as evidenced by a donation by Ranulfe Rabiole. Pierre II, Bishop of Poitiers, around 1100 confirmed the ownership of the church by the monastery and Pope Calixtus II followed his example in 1119. In 1135 however, the parish belonged to the Chapter of Poitiers Cathedral which retained its rights until the French Revolution. Papal bulls dated 1149 and 1157 list the Aulnay church in the list of properties of Canons who were calculating their costs. The church is particularly famous for the early-twelfth-century sculpture on its south and west doorways; it is among the most often discussed examples of this form of Romanesque art. Numerous oriental influences can be seen in its designs. For example, the first arc of one doorway is said to be inspired by Oriental designs. Designs of elephants also originate from Oriental designs. The Church contains several items that are registered as historical objects:
A Painting: Christ with doctors (17th century)
A Statue: Saint Peter as Pope (15th century)
A Stoup (12th century)

The Church of Notre-Dame (12th century) The Church contains one item that is registered as an historical object:
A Baptismal font (12th century)

Facilities

Education

The town has a school grouping which brings together a kindergarten and a primary school located at Rue du 19 Mars 1962 in the town. This school includes all the classes that were previously separated between the girls' school and the boys' school. Although these schools maintained separation of the sexes until the 1960s, the two schools kept their names, despite the mix, until the construction of the new school in the 1990s. The former girls' school which had kindergarten and four classes to CE2 is now a hotel while the old boys' school which had three classes from CE2 to CM2 became the leisure centre for the town.

The Secondary College is a recently created public institution and is located near the site of the famous church of Aulnay. In September 2010 it had 252 pupils taught by a faculty of 22 teachers.

Health Services

Aulnay has a number of services in the medical, paramedical, and medical and social sectors which make it, as the capital of the canton, relatively well equipped in this area for Charente-Maritime.

Medical services
The town has three medical practices for General Practice in the centre of town. There are also two dental practices.

Aulnay does not have medical specialists and people usually visit those at Saint-Jean-d'Angely.

Aulnay does not have a medical radiology or MRI centre. The commune and the entire canton depend on Saint Jean d'Angely for this type of service.

Although the closest hospital is at Saint Jean d'Angely for the most mundane interventions, Aulnay and its canton actually depend on the Centre Hospitalier de Saintonge located in Saintes, some forty kilometres south-west. This hospital offers a very wide range of treatments as it is the largest hospital in the whole central part of the department of Charente-Maritime.

Paramedical services

In this area, Aulnay has a slightly wider range of services. As the chief town of the canton it has a nursing centre in the town and a consulting room elsewhere in the commune. There are two physiotherapy practices and a speech therapist office.

In addition, there are two pharmacies and an optician. The commune does not have a medical laboratory with the nearest being at Saint-Jean-d'Angely.

Two ambulance services are based in Aulnay and cover the whole canton of Aulnay.

Aulnay is also equipped with a rescue centre where firefighters are available to intervene in emergency situations. This centre, under the SDIS Charente-Maritime, depends more directly on the main rescue centre in Saint-Jean d'Angely.

A veterinary clinic is active and serves all of the canton of Aulnay.

Medical and social services
Aulnay has a public retirement facility where there are 43 furnished rooms in sheltered housing located in the town.

Sports
Football is the main sport of the commune with a regional club which in 1976 was the winner of the Challenge Central-West. The junior team also had its moment of glory reaching the qualifying pool for the 16th round of the Coupe Gambardella during the 1991–1992 season (which also included FC Nantes, Chamois Niortais, and Berrichonne de Chateauroux)

Other sports are represented such as archery with the Dungeon Archers Club and handball.

Notable people linked to the commune
Robert Broussard, Chief of Police, comes from Aulnay.

See also
Communes of the Charente-Maritime department

External links
Aulnay on the Community of communes website
art-roman.net Photos of Aulnay
romanes.com Photos of Aulnay
Aulnay on Géoportail, National Geographic Institute (IGN) website 
Aunay on the 1750 Cassini Map

Notes and references

Notes

References

External links
 

Communes of Charente-Maritime
World Heritage Sites in France